The BAR 002 was the car with which the British American Racing Formula One team competed in the 2000 Formula One season. It was driven by the 1997 World Champion Jacques Villeneuve, and Brazilian Ricardo Zonta, both drivers in their second year with the team.

Season

The BAR 002 was the  inaugural season of a Honda engine supply, a partnership which would eventually lead to the team being bought out by the Japanese company for the 2006 season.  The car had its first shakedown with the new engine at Silverstone Circuit in December 1999, where Jacques Villeneuve completed 34 laps.  Due to a focus on the reliability of the car for 2000, visually the car looked very similar to the BAR 01 of the previous season.  

The BAR 002 was launched at the Queen Elizabeth II Centre in London, on 24 January, 2000.  Alongside full time drivers Villeneuve and Zonta, Darren Manning was signed as test driver and Patrick Lemarié continued as a development driver for the season.  This was the first time the BAR had been seen in its new Lucky Strike livery, stepping away from the split branding of Lucky Strike and 555 the season prior.

Following the failure of the 1999 season where BAR scored no points; both Villeneuve and Zonta scored points in the first race at Australia.  Fourth place would be the cars best finish of the season, Villeneuve achieving this across a further three Grand Prix in France, Austria and the United States of America.  Zonta scored points at a total of three Grand Prix in 2000.  

During the season in August, it was announced Ricardo Zonta would be replaced by Olivier Panis for the 2001 season. Zonta later criticising the atmosphere in the team in 2000.

The team finished fifth in the Constructors' Championship, with 20 points. This tally was equal to the Benetton team, but Giancarlo Fisichella's podium finishes ensured that the Anglo-Italian team stayed ahead.

In 2012, chassis 020-05, which scored points in the hands of Zonta at the Italian Grand Prix, was offered for sale at auction in Monaco.  It had been acquired by Brawn GP when purchasing the assets of the former Honda F1 Team.

Complete Formula One results
(key)

References

BAR Formula One cars
2000 Formula One season cars
Reynard Motorsport vehicles